An Obi is the central building in an Igbo homestead, one used most commonly as a place for the reception of guests. As such, it can also be looked at symbolically as a metaphor for the most important part, or heart, of any given place. In fact, due to this, it is otherwise almost exclusively taken to be an aristocratic title amongst the tribe, meaning either elder in the first instance or chief in the second.Made with a thick thatch rood to provide cool shade.

List of Obis who reign as traditional kings
 Obi of Ogwashi-Uku
 , the Obi of Ogwashi-Uku is Eze Chukwuka Okonjo.
Obi of Onitsha
 , the Obi of Onitsha is Igwe Nnaemeka Alfred Ugochukwu Achebe.
 Obi of Neni
  As of 2004, the Obi of Neni is Eze Ngobidy Nwora Emannuel Sandi.

See also
Nigerian traditional rulers

References

Igbo royal titles